The 2016 Bandy World Cup was the 44th annual Bandy World Cup and took place in Göransson Arena in Sandviken, Sweden, on 13-16 October 2016.

Teams
The teams invited to this year's cup were Sandvikens AIK, Bollnäs, Broberg, Edsbyn, Hammarby, Villa Lidköping, Vetlanda, IFK Vänersborg, and Västerås SK from Sweden, Baykal-Energiya, Yenisey, Dynamo Moscow, and SKA-Neftyanik from Russia, Akilles and Botnia-69 from Finland and Stabæk from Norway. After initial group stage games, the tournament ends with a knock-out stage.

Matches

Knock-out stage

Semi finals

Final

References

2016
Sports competitions in Sandviken
2016 in Swedish sport
World Cup
October 2016 sports events in Europe
International bandy competitions hosted by Sweden